State Route 132 (SR 132) was a short secondary state highway in Claiborne County, Tennessee, not accessible to the rest of the state via state-maintained roads. It was a coal haul route that existed as an extension of Kentucky Route 186 southwest of the city of Middlesboro, Kentucky into the unincorporated Manring community. Pavement ended at the end of state maintenance, but since the route was decommissioned after 1997, the roadway has been gradually turned into an unpaved road by the county due to the wear and tear of coal trucks.

Transportation in Claiborne County, Tennessee
Former state highways in Tennessee